Italy–South Korea relations are foreign relations between Italy and South Korea.  Both countries established diplomatic relations on June 26, 1884. 

Italy has an embassy in Seoul. South Korea has an embassy in Rome.

Trade
Trade is sizable between the two nations, according to 2006 figures:

 From Korea to Italy: US$4,300,000,000 (Wireless Communication Devices, Automobile, Ships)
 From Italy to Korea: US$2,900,000,000 (Clothes, Automobile Parts, Chemical Products)

See also 
 Foreign relations of Italy
 Foreign relations of South Korea

References

External links 
  Italian embassy in Seoul
  South Korean embassy in Rome

 

 
Bilateral relations of South Korea
South Korea